The 2014 Indian general election polls in Tamil Nadu were held for 39 seats in the state on 24 April 2014.

The total voter strength of Tamil Nadu is 53,752,682. The voting turnout in the election was 73.67%.

The results of the elections were declared on 16 May 2014.

Background 
As the term of 15th Lok Sabha ended in May 2014, Election Commission of India decided to conduct the election for the next Lok Sabha in April–May 2014.

Dravida Munnetra Kazhagam (DMK) under M. Karunanidhi was part of both (United Progressive Alliance) UPA government until it withdrew support on 19 March 2013 over Sri Lanka issues. DMK suspended their south zone organisational secretary M. K. Alagiri for violating party discipline and later expelled him from the party in March 2014.

In October 2013, Pattali Makkal Katchi (PMK) formed an alliance with smaller parties and caste groups as alternative to Dravidian parties and named it as Social Democratic Alliance (SDA). SDA announced candidates for 10 seats and started their campaign. Gandhiya Makkal Iyakkam leader Tamilaruvi Manian played a significant role to bring parties into the BJP led National Democratic Alliance (NDA) as alternative to Congress led UPA.

In the Indian National Congress (INC), shipping minister G. K. Vasan and finance minister P. Chidambaram were opt out from the election.

The election process are carried out by the state election commission headed by Praveen Kumar and for the first time, Section 144 of CrPC used in the election for 36 hours before polling to prevent cash distribution to bribe voters. As of 23 April, commission seized 390 million (390 million) of money in the state.

Alliances and parties

All India Anna Dravida Munnetra Kazhagam
In the beginning of the year, AIADMK general secretary J. Jayalalithaa stated that she will campaign and win all 39 seats by allying with left parties. AIADMK party members declared herself as the Prime Minister candidate despite rumors that she might support Narendra Modi. On 24 February 2014, J. Jayalalithaa announced candidates for all the 39 constituencies of Tamil Nadu.

National Democratic Alliance

The BJP under PM candidate Narendra Modi have formed an alliance with MDMK, PMK, DMDK, IJK, KMDK and seats were allotted on 20 March 2014.

Democratic Progressive Alliance
Dravida Munnetra Kazhagam named its alliance as Democratic Progressive Alliance. It formed alliance with VCK, MMK, IUML and Puthiya Tamizhagam.

United Progressive Alliance
The INC under the leadership of Rahul Gandhi stated that they will decide on a PM candidate after the election. They lost their major ally from UPA 1 and 2 administration DMK last year. They decided to contest alone, to all 39 seats in the state.

CPI(M)-CPI
After six rounds of seat-sharing talks with AIADMK for the Lok Sabha seats in Tamil Nadu and Puducherry failed to bear fruit, the Communist Party of India (Marxist) and the Communist Party of India opted to make an alliance of their own. On 14 March 2014 the two parties held a joint press conference in Chennai, declaring that CPI(M) would contest nine seats in Tamil Nadu and CPI would contest eight seats in Tamil Nadu and the Puducherry seat.

Aam Aadmi Party 
Aam Aadmi Party announced its candidates for 25 seats.

Opinion poll

List of candidates

Results

Party-wise results 

|-
! style="background-color:#E9E9E9" colspan=2 |Alliance/Party
! style="background-color:#E9E9E9;text-align:right;" |Seats won
! style="background-color:#E9E9E9;text-align:right;" |Change
! style="background-color:#E9E9E9;text-align:right;" |Popular Vote
! style="background-color:#E9E9E9;text-align:right;" |Vote %
|-
! colspan=2 style="text-align:center;vertical-align:middle;background-color:#009900; color:white"|AIADMK
| 37
| +28
|17,983,168 
|44.3%
|-
! colspan=2 style="text-align:center;vertical-align:middle;background-color:"|NDA
| 2
| +2
|7,523,829
|18.5%
|-
|BJP
! style="background-color:" |
| 1	
| +1 
|2,222,090 
|5.5%
|-
|PMK
! style="background-color:" |
| 1	
| +1
|1,804,812 
|4.4%
|-
|DMDK
! style="background-color:" |
| 0
| -
|2,079,392 
|5.1%
|-
|MDMK
! style="background-color:"|
| 0
| -1
|1,417,535 
|3.5%
|-
! colspan=2 style="text-align:center;vertical-align:middle;background-color:"|DPA
|0 
|0
|10,887,347 
|26.8%
|-
|DMK
! style="background-color: "|
| 0 	 	 	
| -18
|9,575,850 
|23.6%
|-
|VCK
! style="background-color: "|
| 0	 	 	
| -1
|606,110 
|1.5% 
|-
|PT
! style="background-color:" |
| 0	 	 	
| -
|262,812
|0.6% 
|-
|MMK
! style="background-color:" |
| 0	 	 	
| -
|236,679 
|0.6% 
|-
|IUML
! style="background-color:" |
| 0 	 	
| -
|205,896 
|0.5%
|-
! colspan=2 style="text-align:center;vertical-align:middle;background-color:"|INC
| 0
| -8 
|1,751,123
|4.3%
|-
! colspan=2 style="text-align:center;vertical-align:middle;background-color: color:white"|Others
| 0
| 
|
|
|-
|CPI(M)
! style="background-color: " |
| 0 	
| -1
|220,614 
|0.5%  
|-
|CPI
! style="background-color:" |
| 0  	
| -1
|219,866 
|0.5%
|-
|AAP
! style="background-color: "|
| 0 	
| -
|203,175 
|0.5%  
|-
|BSP
! style="background-color:" |
| 0  	
| -
|155,964 
|0.4%
|-
|IND
! style="background-color:"|
| 0 	
| -
|866,509 
|2.1%
|-
|NOTA
! style="background-color:" |
| 0  	
| -
|582062 
|1.4%
|-
| style="text-align:center;" |Total
! style="background-color: " |
| 39
| 
| 
| 100%
|-
|}

Note: IJK, KMDK and PNK were contested under the BJP symbol.

Constituency-wise results 
Constituency-wise results:

See also 
 Elections in Tamil Nadu

References

External links
 Official Website of Election Commission of India
 Election statistics provided by ECI

Tamil
Indian general elections in Tamil Nadu
2010s in Tamil Nadu